Oschiri (Gallurese: Óscari) is a comune (municipality) and former bishopric in the Province of Sassari in the Italian region Sardinia, located about  north of Cagliari and about  southwest of Olbia.
 

The municipality of Oschiri contains the frazione (subdivision) San Leonardo.

Oschiri borders the following municipalities: Alà dei Sardi, Berchidda, Buddusò, Ozieri, Pattada, Tempio Pausania, Tula.

Ecclesiastical history 
See Castro for namesakes

Bishopric of Castro (di Sardegna) 

Within the comune of Oschiri is the church of Nostra Signora di Castro, which was once the cathedral episcopal see of a diocese, centred on the now disappeared town of Castro. It was suffragan of the Metropolitan Archdiocese of Sassari.
 
The bishopric dates back to Byzantine times (circa 1000 AD), but the earliest mention of a bishop of Castro is of 1116, when an unnamed bishop of the see assisted at the dedication of the Basilica di Saccargia. In 1164, its bishop Atto dedicated a church in the locality of Aneleto and granted it in the following year to Camaldolese monks.
 
Castro later decayed, and the bishop's residence was transferred to Bono.
 
On 8 December 1503, the territory of Castro and that of two other dioceses were combined to form the new diocese of Alghero (now Alghero-Bosa). Today what was the territory of Castro is part of that of the diocese of Ozieri

Titular see 
Castro itself, no longer a residential bishopric, is listed by the Catholic Church as a titular see since its nominal restoration as a Latin Catholic titular bishopric in 1968, initially simply as Castro, since 1976 as Castro di Sardegna, avoiding confusion with sees named Castro in Lazio and in Puglia.

It has had the following incumbents, both of the lowest (episcopal) and intermediary (archiepiscopal) ranks :
Titular Archbishop Giuseppe Pittau, Jesuits (S.J.) (1998.07.11 – 2014.12.26)
Titular Bishop Alfonso Sánchez Peña, Claretians (C.M.F.) (1969.07.28 – 1997.07.11)
Titular Bishop (2015.07.15 – ...) Dominicus Meier, Benedictine Order (O.S.B.), Auxiliary Bishop of Paderborn (Germany)

Demographic evolution

References

Sources and external links
 GigaCatholic, with titular incumbent biography links

Cities and towns in Sardinia